TAA1 may refer to:
 L-tryptophan—pyruvate aminotransferase
 Toyota TAA-1